Singhana is a town having sub-Tehsil and panchayat smiti, located in Jhunjhunu district of Rajasthan, in India.

Education

Colleges near Singhana 
 Arya Mahavidyalaya
 Krishna PG College Singhana
 Naresh Kanya Mahavidhlaya Singhana
 Saraswati Pg College Buhana
 Satguru Shikshan Sansthan Mahila Mahavidyalaya
 Shrawani Kanya Mahavidyalaya
 Shri Krishan P. G. College, Singhana
 Vishwa Bharti Degree College, Singhana

Schools near Singhana 
 Kendriya Vidyalaya School, Khetri, Nagar
 Sophia Secondary School, Khetri, Nagar
 Central Academy, Khetri, Nagar
 Govt. Sr. Sec. School, Kuharwas
 Adarsh Public school| Bhirr
 Govt Secondary School, Ghaseda.                               
 Govt Sr Sec School Makro
 Govt Sr Sec School Khetri Nagar
 Cambridge Sr.Sec. school Singhana                                 
 New Singhana Academy Sr.Sec.School Singhana.
 Anuj Public Sr. Sec. School, Singhana.                                                                 
 Deshraj public school near Saray Mohalla
 Vishwa Bharti Sr. Sec. School, Singhana
 Geeta Public Sr. Sec. School, Singhana
 New Indian Sr. Sec. School, Singhana

Local 
A lot of people in the area are NRIs. Most residents are involved in commercial trade and farming. Hindi and Marwari are the local languages.

Banks 
 State Bank Of India.
 ICICI Bank.
 Central Bank of India.
 HDFC Bank.
 Bank of Baroda.
 Punjab National Bank.
 IDFC first bank.

Healthcare

Hospitals 
 
• Community Health Center. 
 
• Raj Hospital And Fracture Clinic.
 
• Chakrapani Hospital.
 
• Aayush Child & Dental Hospital.
 
• Govt Hospital of Rajasthan.

• kk hospital singhana ( dr.kishanlal)

Location 
Singhana is situated in Jhunjhunun, Rajasthan, India. Its geographical coordinates are 28° 5'N, 75° 50'E. It is located 60 km east of Jhunjhunu, 13 km from Buhana, 165 km from Jaipur the state capital and 180 km from the national capital, Delhi.Mankota kalan (4 km), Muradpur (7 km), Moi Sadda (6 Km), Thali (6 Km), और Khanpur (7 Km) was nearest village

References 

Cities and towns in Jhunjhunu district